Hugo Houle (born 27 September 1990) is a Canadian professional cyclist, who rides for UCI WorldTeam .

Career
Born in Sainte-Perpétue, Centre-du-Québec, Quebec, Houle began racing triathlons, aged 10, alongside his brother, before focussing on cycling at the age of 16. He became acquainted with former professional cyclist Louis Garneau, who provided him with a team and equipment. Between 2008 and 2010, Houle combined cycling with completing a college degree in Québec. After graduating, he signed his first professional contract with Canadian team . He also finished third in the Canadian National Time Trial Championships in 2012, as well as finishing fourth at the under-23 road race at the 2012 UCI Road World Championships.

AG2R La Mondiale (2013–17)
 disbanded at the end of the 2012 season, and Houle moved to French professional team . During this time, he competed in the Giro d'Italia twice and the Vuelta a España once. He also won the time trial at the Pan American Games and the Canadian National Time Trial Championships in 2015. In 2016, he was officially named in Canada's 2016 Olympic team.

Astana (2018–21)
He rode his first Tour de France in 2019. In September 2019, he extended his contract with  through 2022. He represented Canada at the 2020 Summer Olympics.

Israel–Premier Tech

Having featured in the breakaway on the ninth stage of the Tour de France without success, Houle was involved in a successful breakaway four stages later with Mads Pedersen and Fred Wright; Houle led out the sprint in Saint-Étienne, but was beaten to the line by both Pedersen and Wright. Following the final rest day, Houle made his third breakaway of the race on stage 16. With  remaining, Houle opened a gap on the rest of the breakaway and soloed away to win the stage by more than a minute ahead of Valentin Madouas and teammate Michael Woods. This made him only the second Canadian rider to win an individual stage in the Tour de France, after his  directeur sportif Steve Bauer, who won the first stage in 1988. He then followed this up with second place overall, behind Andreas Leknessund, at the Arctic Race of Norway.

Personal life
Houle's brother, Pierrick, was killed by a drunk driver in 2012 while out running. Since then, Houle has contributed to Opération Nez Rouge, a charity which aims to stop drink-driving on the roads.

Houle dedicated his win in Stage 16 of the 2022 Tour de France to his brother.

Major results
Source: 

2010
 1st  Time trial, National Under-23 Road Championships
2011
 National Under-23 Road Championships
1st  Road race
1st  Time trial
 3rd Overall Tour de Québec
2012
 National Road Championships
1st  Under-23 time trial
3rd Time trial
 1st  Overall Tour de Québec
1st Stage 3
 1st Mountains classification Coupe des nations Ville Saguenay
 2nd Overall Tour de Beauce
1st  Young rider classification
 4th Road race, UCI Under-23 Road World Championships
2014
 2nd Time trial, National Road Championships
2015
 1st  Time trial, Pan American Games
 1st  Time trial, National Road Championships
2016
 2nd Overall Tour de Beauce
2017
 5th Overall Boucles de la Mayenne
2018
 4th Overall Tour Poitou-Charentes en Nouvelle-Aquitaine
 8th Overall Danmark Rundt
2019
 5th Overall Arctic Race of Norway
2021
 1st  Time trial, National Road Championships
  Combativity award Stage 10 Tour de France
2022
 Tour de France
1st Stage 16
 Combativity award Stage 16
 2nd Overall Arctic Race of Norway
2023
 8th Overall Étoile de Bessèges

Grand Tour general classification results timeline

References

External links

Cyclingbase profile for Hugo Houle

1990 births
Canadian male cyclists
Living people
Cyclists at the 2016 Summer Olympics
Olympic cyclists of Canada
Pan American Games gold medalists for Canada
Cyclists at the 2015 Pan American Games
Canadian Tour de France stage winners
Pan American Games medalists in cycling
Canadian people of French descent
People from Centre-du-Québec
Medalists at the 2015 Pan American Games
Cyclists at the 2020 Summer Olympics
Cyclists from Quebec
21st-century Canadian people